}}
Young Maverick is a 1979 television series and a sequel to the 1957–1962 series Maverick, which had starred James Garner as roving gambler Bret Maverick. Charles Frank played Ben Maverick, the son of Bret's first cousin Beau Maverick, making him Bret's first cousin once removed. Frank's real-life wife Susan Blanchard played his girlfriend Nell, while John Dehner (a frequent guest-star in various roles in several Maverick episodes including "Shady Deal at Sunny Acres") appeared as a frontier marshal who had arrested Ben's father Beau decades before. The series was cancelled by CBS after six hour-long episodes had been shown, leaving two which were never aired on the network. All eight episodes were screened later that year on BBC1 in the UK.

The 1978 TV-movie The New Maverick, featuring Garner as Bret, Frank as Ben, Jack Kelly as Bret's brother Bart Maverick, and Blanchard as Nell, served as the pilot for the series. (Garner appeared briefly in the first regular episode of Young Maverick, "Clancy," making him the only person to appear in all three series.) Among the actors appearing on Young Maverick were Howard Duff, John McIntire, James Woods, Donna Mills (all in "Dead Man's Hand," parts 1 and 2), J. Pat O'Malley ("A Fistful Of Oats"), Morgan Fairchild, John Hillerman (both "Makin' Tracks") and Harry Dean Stanton. Roger Moore, who played Beau Maverick (Ben's father) in the original series, never appeared in Young Maverick. Despite the title, Frank was three years older than Garner had been at the launch of the original series.

Cast
Charles Frank as Ben Maverick 
Susan Blanchard as Nell McGarrahan
John Dehner as Marshall Edge Troy

Episode list

DVD release
On March 1, 2016, Warner Archive Collection released Young Maverick- The Complete Series on DVD in Region 1 for the very first time.  This is a manufacture-on-demand (MOD) release, available exclusively through Warner's online store and Amazon.com.

References

External links

1970s Western (genre) television series
1980s Western (genre) television series
1979 American television series debuts
1980 American television series endings
Television series by Warner Bros. Television Studios
CBS original programming
Television shows set in Ohio
Maverick (TV series)